John Handegard (born May 18, 1938) is a retired professional ten-pin bowler who has spent time on both the PBA Tour and the PBA Senior Tour (now PBA50 Tour). For over two decades, he ranked as the all-time leader in PBA50 Tour titles with 14, until being surpassed by Walter Ray Williams Jr. in 2021. Handegard is a three-time PBA Senior Player of the Year (1991, 1995 and 1996). On January 24, 2009, Handegard became the first inductee into the newly launched PBA Senior Hall of Fame. He is also a 2010 inductee to the USBC Hall of Fame in the Veterans category, and a 2019 inductee to the Oregon Bowling Hall of Fame.

Handegard made PBA history at the 1995 Northwest Classic, when he defeated PBA Hall of Famer Mark Williams, 278–247, to become the oldest player (57 years, 55 days) to ever win a regular PBA Tour event. That eclipsed the 30-year-old mark set by Buzz Fazio, who won a December 1964 PBA tournament at age 56.

References

American ten-pin bowling players
1938 births
Living people